Atractotomus mali is a species of plant bug in the family Miridae. It is found in Europe and Northern Asia (excluding China) and North America.

References

Further reading

External links

 

Phylinae
Articles created by Qbugbot
Insects described in 1843
Hemiptera of Europe
Hemiptera of Asia
Hemiptera of North America